Leopoldo Américo Miguez (9 September 1850 – 6 July 1902) was a Brazilian composer.

Miguez was born in Niterói. He was known as a champion of the music of Richard Wagner. He also directed the "Instituto Nacional de Musica." He also wrote the music for Brazil's Hymn for the Proclamation of the Republic.  He died in Rio de Janeiro.

References

External links

1850 births
Brazilian classical composers
1902 deaths
People from Niterói